Beketamun or Beket was a princess of the Eighteenth Dynasty of Egypt, a daughter of Pharaoh Thutmose III. Her name means “Handmaid of Amun”.

Her name is inscribed on a faience votive object (together with her father's cartouche) found in Deir el-Bahri (now in Boston). She is also mentioned on a wooden staff of her servant, Amenmose, and probably on a scarab (now in the British Museum). It is possible that she is the princess standing behind Princess Meritamen in the Hathor chapel in Deir el-Bahri.

Sources

15th-century BC Egyptian women
Princesses of the Eighteenth Dynasty of Egypt
Children of Thutmose III